Highway 73 is a highway in the Jezreel Valley in northern Israel. It proceeds from Nahalal junction in the west toward Adashim junction in the east. It is 12 km long.

History 
With the establishment of Gvat and Sarid and settlement in the area of the Sharon Group and the Ayanot Group (which later established Ramat David) in 1926, representatives of the localities began to demand that the government pave the road that would connect the new localities to Afula-Nazareth Road and Haifa-Nazareth Road. The first section of the road, which connected Route 60 with Ginegar, was paved in 1930.

Before it was paved, the route of the road was used by passengers from Jerusalem and from Tel Aviv to Haifa to bypass Nazareth. Towards the end of 1934, an agreement was reached between the government and the surrounding localities on the construction of the road between Ginegar and Nahalal, but in July 1935 the governor of the Nazareth district announced that the construction would be delayed for budgetary reasons. Haim Gvati hypothesized that the lack of paving of the road stems from the desire to prevent the diversion of traffic to Haifa from passing through Nazareth in a way that could harm trade in the city. Preliminary work to pave the road began in early 1936. With the outbreak of the Arab Revolt, pressure increased from the Jewish community to pave the road, due to attacks on vehicles of Jews passing through Nazareth and in August 1936 the High Commissioner issued an official statement that the road was defined as a public project for land expropriation. The work was handed over to Solel Boneh and the paving of the road began in September 1936. The settlers in the surrounding localities participated in paving the road, for which purpose they purchased a truck, which later became known thanks to the children's song "Our big green car" (version of Vi gå över daggstänkta berg).

In November 1936 the work was stopped due to the rains, and it was renewed in March 1937 and the road was completed in July 1937. The road was paved 5.5 meters wide and 11.6 kilometers long. In March 1938, repairs were made to the road near kibbutz Sarid.

Initially, there was talk of paving a 3-meter-wide road at a cost of 3,000 pounds, and that the localities would participate in half the cost. Later, however, it was decided on a 5.5-meter-wide road at a cost of 17,500 pounds, and the government demanded that the localities participate in 5,000 pounds. On the advice of Moshe Sharett, the localities agreed, as part of the amount was promised by other localities in the area that also benefited from the paving of the road.

Junctions

See also
 List of highways in Israel

References

External links 

 Road 73 from Adashim Junction to Nahalal Junction

73